Mirpur 10 metro station (romanised: Mirpur dosh metro steshen) is a metro station of the Dhaka Metro's MRT Line 6. This station is located next to Fire Service in Mirpur 10, a suburb of Dhaka. The station was opened on 1 March 2023.

Station

Station layout

References

Dhaka Metro stations
Railway stations opened in 2023
2023 establishments in Bangladesh